Hydrocolus is a genus of beetles in the family Dytiscidae, containing the following species:

 Hydrocolus deflatus (Fall, 1923)
 Hydrocolus filiolus (Fall, 1923)
 Hydrocolus heggiensis Ciegler, 2001
 Hydrocolus oblitoides Roughley & Larson, 2000
 Hydrocolus oblitus (Aubé, 1838)
 Hydrocolus paugus (Fall, 1923)
 Hydrocolus persimilis (Crotch, 1873)
 Hydrocolus rubyae (Larson, 1975)
 Hydrocolus rufiplanulus (Fall, 1923)
 Hydrocolus rupinus Roughley & Larson, 2000
 Hydrocolus sahlbergi Nilsson, 2001
 Hydrocolus stagnalis (Gemminger & Harold, 1868)

References

Dytiscidae